Ilona Longo (née Schoknecht, divorced Briesenick and Slupianek; born 24 September 1956) is a German former shot putter who represented East Germany. As Ilona Slupianek, she won the 1980 Olympic title in Moscow and won European titles in 1978 and 1982. She is also a seven-time GDR champion. She twice broke the world record with puts of 22.36 metres and 22.45 metres in 1980. She was suspended for a year for doping.

Career
Born in Demmin, in the East German  Bezirk Neubrandenburg, as Ilona Schoknecht she finished fifth at the 1976 Montreal Olympics with 20.54m. In 1977, she was disqualified after she tested positive for anabolic steroids at the European Cup meeting in Helsinki, where she dominated her event with a superlative 21.20.

The International Amateur Athletics Federation suspended Slupianek for 12 months, a penalty that ended two days before the 1978 European championships in Prague. In the reverse of what the IAAF hoped, sending her home to East Germany meant she was free to train unchecked with anabolic steroids, if she wanted to, and then compete for another gold medal. Now competing as Ilona Slupianek, she did win the gold medal in Prague, with a put of 21.41m. She went on to win the European Indoor title in 1979. She then won the gold medal at the 1980 Summer Olympics in Moscow. In the next years she obtained gold at the European Indoor Championships in 1981 and the European Championships in 1982, followed by a bronze medal at the 1983 World Championships.

In 1984, she married fellow GDR shot putter Hartmut Briesenick. Competing as Ilona Briesenick, she won her final major medal when winning silver at the 1987 World Indoor Championships.

From 1976 to 1986 she was a deputy in the East German legislature, the Volkskammer, for the FDJ. She married for the third time in 2008. As of 2013, she lives in Italy. She had one daughter with Briesenick.

See also
List of doping cases in athletics

References

1956 births
Living people
People from Demmin
Free German Youth members
Members of the 7th Volkskammer
Members of the 8th Volkskammer
East German female shot putters
Olympic athletes of East Germany
Athletes (track and field) at the 1976 Summer Olympics
Athletes (track and field) at the 1980 Summer Olympics
World Athletics Championships athletes for East Germany
German sportspeople in doping cases
Doping cases in athletics
German sportsperson-politicians
Female members of the Volkskammer
Olympic gold medalists in athletics (track and field)
Universiade medalists in athletics (track and field)
Olympic gold medalists for East Germany
Medalists at the 1980 Summer Olympics
World Athletics Championships medalists
European Athletics Championships medalists
World record setters in athletics (track and field)
Recipients of the Patriotic Order of Merit in gold
Track & Field News Athlete of the Year winners
Universiade gold medalists for East Germany
World Athletics Indoor Championships medalists
Medalists at the 1979 Summer Universiade